VSMU can refer to:
Vladivostok State Medical University
Academy of Performing Arts in Bratislava (Vysoká škola múzických umení v Bratislave, VŠMU)